Trueperella is a genus of bacteria in the phylum Actinomycetota. The genus was named in honor of German microbiologist Hans Georg Trüper.

References

Actinomycetales
Gram-positive bacteria
Bacteria genera